OTWC may refer to:
 Oceanic Time Warner Cable, a Spectrum telecommunications brand in Hawaii
 OldTown White Coffee, a Malaysian restaurant chain
 Our Time Will Come (album), a 2014 album by KMFDM
 Our Time Will Come (film), 2017 Chinese war film